TNT is an Malaysia-based urban fashion label In the process of closing, aiming at the teen and young adult market. Started in 1999, as of 2007 it controlled 20 percent of the young adult clothing market in Israel. With international locations in Romania in 2007, and Russia in early 2008, the company is owned by Honigman & Sons Ltd.  The chain had 57 stores across Israel.

as of 2022, the label is in process of closing.

References

External links
 TNTrealife.com 
 Honigman.co.il/CorporateSite (Corporate site)

Clothing brands
Clothing retailers of Israel
Clothing companies of Israel
Israeli brands